The Minister Plenipotentiary of Curaçao represents the constituent country of Curaçao in the Council of Ministers of the Kingdom of the Netherlands. The current Minister Plenipotentiary of Curaçao is Carlson Manuel. The Minister Plenipotentiary and his cabinet are seated in the "Curaçaohuis" (Curaçao House) in The Hague (which was the location of the Antillenhuis before the dissolution of the Netherlands Antilles).

A significant difference between the Netherlands Ministers and the Ministers Plenipotentiary is that the former Ministers are accountable for their politics and policies to the Dutch parliament. The Ministers Plenipotentiary, however, are accountable to their national governments. Therefore, the Ministers Plenipotentiary usually do not resign in the event of a Dutch cabinet crisis.

List of Ministers Plenipotentiary of Curaçao
The following table lists the Ministers Plenipotentiary of Curaçao that have been in office since Curaçao became a country in the Kingdom of the Netherlands in 2010:

References

Government of Curaçao